Geremia Di Costanzo (born 19 December 1960) is an Italian taekwondo practitioner. He is also known as Geremia Di Constanzo or Gabriel Di Costanzo. He competed in the men's flyweight at the 1988 Summer Olympics.

References

External links
 
 

1960 births
Place of birth unknown
Living people
Italian male taekwondo practitioners
Olympic taekwondo practitioners of Italy
Taekwondo practitioners at the 1988 Summer Olympics
World Taekwondo Championships medalists
European Taekwondo Championships medalists
20th-century Italian people
21st-century Italian people